Anhe Ghore Da Daan is a 2011 Indian Punjabi-language film directed by Gurvinder Singh. It is based on the 1976 novel of the same name by Gurdial Singh. It portrays the plight and problems of farmers in Punjab, India, rural working class, as well as the landlords. The film won National Awards for Best Direction, Cinematography and Best Feature Film in Punjabi at the 59th National Film Awards of India.

The film was shot in and around Bathinda city in Feb-March 2011.

Cast

Samuel John as Melu, the rickshaw puller
Mal Singh as Father
Sarbjeet Kaur as Dayalo
Emmanuel Singh as Bhupi
Kulvinder Kaur as Ballo, Melu's wife
Lakha Singh as Lakha
Gurvinder Makhna as Dulla
Dharminder Kaur as Mother

Plot
The film is set in a village in the outskirts of Bathinda city where villagers work in the fields of the local landlord. It is a village where people are trying hard to make peace with their existence. Daily rituals betray their simmering anger and their helplessness. The landlord has apparently sold his plots to an industry which has demolished the house of one of the villagers who refuses to vacate it. The elderly farmer's son is a rickshaw puller in the nearby town. The rickshaw pullers have gone on a strike that has turned violent. Both father and son are equally clueless about their futures.

Awards
Anhe Ghore Da Daan is the first Punjabi-language film to have travelled to numerous international film festivals. The film premiered in the Orizzonti section (Horizons) at the 68th Venice International Film Festival. It won the Special Jury Award and the $50,000 Black Pearl trophy at the Abu Dhabi Film Festival. It was also shown at the 55th BFI London Film Festival, 49th New York Film Festival and the 16th Busan International Film Festival. The film won National Awards for Best Direction and Cinematography (for cinematographer Satya Raj Nagpaul) at the 59th National Film Awards of India. In the regional category (Punjabi language) it was given another award for best film in 59th National Film Awards. This film has also won the Golden Peacock (Best Film) at the 42nd International Film Festival of India.

References

External links
 

2011 films
Indian drama films
2011 drama films
Films based on Indian novels
Films whose director won the Best Director National Film Award
Films whose cinematographer won the Best Cinematography National Film Award
Indian avant-garde and experimental films
Punjabi-language Indian films
2010s Punjabi-language films
2010s avant-garde and experimental films
Best Punjabi Feature Film National Film Award winners
2011 directorial debut films
National Film Development Corporation of India films